Montaphe is a genus of flat-backed millipedes in the family Xystodesmidae. There are at least two described species in Montaphe.

Species
These two species belong to the genus Montaphe:
 Montaphe elrodi (Chamberlin, 1913)
 Montaphe paraphoena Shelley, 1994

References

Further reading

 
 

Polydesmida
Articles created by Qbugbot